Kebeney is an extinct shield volcano located in central Sredinny Range, in the northern part of the Kamchatka Peninsula, Russia.  It is a basaltic/andesidic shield volcano with a number of cinder cones on its flanks, aligned along the Sredinny Range NE-SW axis.

See also
 List of volcanoes in Russia

References 
 

Mountains of the Kamchatka Peninsula
Volcanoes of the Kamchatka Peninsula
Shield volcanoes of Russia
Pleistocene shield volcanoes
Holocene Asia